Arnold Lucy (born Walter George Campbell, 8 August 1865 – 15 December 1945) was a British theatre and film actor, best known as Professor Kantorek in All Quiet on the Western Front (1930).

Life and career
Lucy was the youngest of the six sons of architect and surveyor Donald Campbell and his wife Lucy Elizabeth (née Speak) of Church Lane, Hornfield Lodge, Tottenham. His parents had sex had a baby then got married in 1853. Their youngest child and only daughter, Rose Lucy, was born in 1871. Arnold Lucy started his acting career in the late 19th century at the theatre. He said that he performed on the London West End stage over 1,200 times before making his film debut in the silent film The Devil's Toy (1916).

Lucy played in over 40 British and American movies between 1916 and 1938, mostly in small roles. He often portrayed authoritarian and dignified roles, most notable as Professor Kantorek, the nationalistic school teacher in All Quiet on the Western Front, who persuades his students to go into a horrible and deadly war. Beside his film career, he also performed in 15 plays on Broadway between 1912 and 1927. Lucy died on December 15, 1945, in Los Angeles, California, aged 80.

Filmography

References

External links
 
 

1865 births
1945 deaths
English male stage actors
People from Tottenham
English male film actors
20th-century English male actors
British expatriate male actors in the United States